Pomerania (Kashubian: Pòmòrskô) is a historical region on the southern shore of the Baltic Sea in Central Europe, split between Poland and Germany. The western part of Pomerania belongs to the German states of Mecklenburg-Western Pomerania and Brandenburg, while the eastern part belongs to the West Pomeranian, Pomeranian and Kuyavian-Pomeranian voivodeships of Poland. 

Pomerania's historical border in the west is the Mecklenburg-Western Pomeranian border Urstromtal which now constitutes the border between the Mecklenburgian and Pomeranian part of Mecklenburg-Western Pomerania, while it is bounded by the Vistula River in the east. The easternmost part of Pomerania is alternatively known as Pomerelia, consisting of four sub-regions: Kashubia inhabited by ethnic Kashubians, Kociewie, Tuchola Forest and Chełmno Land.

Pomerania has a relatively low population density, with its largest cities being Gdańsk and Szczecin. Outside its urban areas, it is characterized by farmland, dotted with numerous lakes, forests, and small towns. In the west of Pomerania lie several islands, the largest of which are Rügen, the largest island in Germany, Usedom/Uznam, and Wolin, the largest island in Poland. The region has a rich and complicated political and demographic history at the intersection of several cultures.

Geography

Borders
Pomerania is the area along the Bay of Pomerania of the Baltic Sea between the rivers Recknitz, Trebel, Tollense and Augraben in the west and Vistula in the east. It formerly reached perhaps as far south as the Noteć river, but since the 13th century its southern boundary has been placed further north.

Landscape
Most of the region is coastal lowland, being part of the Central European Plain, but its southern, hilly parts belong to the Baltic Ridge, a belt of terminal moraines formed during the Pleistocene. Within this ridge, a chain of moraine-dammed lakes constitutes the Pomeranian Lake District. The soil is generally rather poor, sometimes sandy or marshy.

The western coastline is jagged, with many peninsulas (such as Darß–Zingst) and islands (including Rügen, Usedom, and Wolin) enclosing numerous bays (Bodden) and lagoons (the biggest being the Lagoon of Szczecin).

The eastern coastline is smooth. Łebsko and several other lakes were formerly bays, but have been cut off from the sea. The easternmost coastline along the Gdańsk Bay (with the Bay of Puck) and Vistula Lagoon, has the Hel Peninsula and the Vistula peninsula jutting out into the Baltic.

Subregions
The Pomeranian region has the following administrative divisions:

 Western Pomerania (Vorpommern) in northeastern Germany, stretching from the Recknitz river to the Oder–Neisse line. This region is part of the federal state of Mecklenburg-Western Pomerania. The southernmost part of historical Western Pomerania (the Gartz area) is now in Brandenburg, while its historical eastern parts (the Oder estuary) are now in Poland. Western Pomerania comprises the historical regions inhabited by Western Slavic tribes Rugians and Volinians, otherwise the Principality of Rügen and the County of Gützkow.
 The West Pomeranian Voivodeship (Zachodniopomorskie) in Poland, stretching from the Oder–Neisse line to the Wieprza river, encompassing most of historical Pomerania in the narrow sense (as well as small parts of historic Greater Poland and Lubusz Land).
 The Pomeranian Voivodeship, with similar borders to Pomerelia, stretching from the Wieprza river to the Vistula delta in the vicinity of Gdańsk.
 The northern half of the Kuyavian-Pomeranian Voivodeship, comprising most of Tuchola Forest and Chełmno Land.

The bulk of Farther Pomerania is included within the modern West Pomeranian Voivodeship, but its easternmost parts (the Słupsk area) now constitute the northwest of Pomeranian Voivodeship. Farther Pomerania in turn comprises several other historical subregions, most notably the Principality of Cammin, the County of Naugard, and the Lands of Schlawe and Stolp, 

The Lauenburg and Bütow Land is considered a part of Pomerelia (Kashubia) by the Polish historiography, and of Farther Pomerania by the German historiography.

Parts of Pomerania and surrounding regions have constituted a euroregion since 1995. The Pomerania euroregion comprises Hither Pomerania and Uckermark in Germany, West Pomerania in Poland, and Scania in Sweden.

Nomenclature

Etymology
In Lechitic languages the prefix "po-" means along; unlike the word "po", which means after. Pomorze, therefore, means Along the Sea. This construction is similar to toponyms Pogórze (Along the Mountains), Polesie (Along the Forest), Porzecze (Along the River), etc.

Earliest sources
Pomerania was first mentioned in an imperial document of 1046, referring to a Zemuzil dux Bomeranorum (Zemuzil, Duke of the Pomeranians). Pomerania is mentioned repeatedly in the chronicles of Adam of Bremen (c. 1070) and Gallus Anonymous (ca. 1113).

Terminology and attributal of subdivisions
Already the territorial designation  "Pomerania" lacks a universally accepted definition since it may refer either to combined Hither and Farther Pomerania only (in German contemporary and historical usage) or to Hither and Farther Pomerania combined with Pomerelia (in Polish contemporary and historical usage).

As a consequence, the term "West Pomerania" is ambiguous, since it may refer to either Hither Pomerania (in German usage and historical usage based on German terminology), or to combined Hither and Farther Pomerania (in Polish usage and historical usage based on German terminology). In parallel, the term "East Pomerania" may similarly carry different meanings, referring either to Farther Pomerania (in German usage and historical usage based on German terminology), or to Pomerelia (in Polish usage and historical usage based on German terminology).

As a further complication, the borders of the eponymous administrative units have been drawn disregarding mostly the historical ones. The Polish unit called województwo zachodniopomorskie (West Pomeranian Voivodeship) includes the whole Polish part of Hither Pomerania, but only the western two-thirds of Farther Pomerania, with the remaining easternmost one-third (Słupsk, Ustka, Miastko) has been part of the województwo pomorskie ([East-]Pomeranian Voivodeship). The former regional unit stretches however far more south than the historical region, to include the northern part of the historical Neumark (Dębno, Chojna, Trzcińsko-Zdrój, Myślibórz, Nowogródek Pomorski, Lipiany, Barlinek, Pełczyce, Suchań, Choszczno, Recz, Drawno), as well as a strip the historical Greater Poland (Tuczno, Człopa, Mirosławiec, Wałcz, Czaplinek), or even a small part of Pomerelia (Biały Bór); in turn the other one comprises only approximately northern two-thirds of Pomerelia but also parts of historical Malbork Land and Upper Prussia known under the ethnographic designation of Powiśle and constituting the westernmost strip of historical Prussia; and finally, the remaining one third of Pomerelia forms part of województwo kujawsko-pomorskie (Kuyavian-Pomeranian Voivodeship), a further regional unit, in this case bearing a name accurately reflecting historical heterogeneity of its territory. Similarity but to lesser extent, borders of the combined German districts Vorpommern-Rügen and Vorpommern-Greifswald deviate significantly in numerous locations from the historical ones with Mecklenburg and Brandenburg. As a consequence, the common understanding of the terms has started to be used more and more frequently in the sense of the  current administrative units.

History

Prehistory to the Middle Ages (circa 400 A.D. – 1400 A.D.)

Settlement in the area called Pomerania for the last 1,000 years started by the end of the Vistula Glacial Stage, some 13,000 years ago. Archeological traces have been found of various cultures during the Stone and Bronze Age, Baltic peoples, Germanic peoples and Veneti during the Iron Age and, in the Dark Ages, West Slavic tribes and Vikings. Starting in the 10th century, early Polish rulers subdued the region, successfully integrating the eastern part with Poland, while the western part fell under the suzerainty of Denmark and the Holy Roman Empire in the late 12th century. Gdańsk, established during the reign of Mieszko I of Poland has since become Poland's main port (apart from periods of Poland losing control over the region).

In the 12th century, the Duchy of Pomerania (western part), as a vassal state of Poland, became Christian under saint Otto of Bamberg (the Apostle of the Pomeranians); at the same time Pomerelia (eastern part) became a part of diocese of Włocławek within Poland. Since the late 12th-early 13th century, the Griffin Duchy of Pomerania stayed with the Holy Roman Empire and the Principality of Rugia with Denmark, while Pomerelia, under the ruling of Samborides, was a part of Poland. Pomerania, during its alliance in the Holy Roman Empire, shared borders with West Slavic state Oldenburg, as well as Poland and the expanding Margraviate of Brandenburg. In the early 14th century the Teutonic Knights invaded and annexed Pomerelia from Poland into their monastic state, which already included historical Prussia. As a result of the Teutonic rule, in German terminology the name of Prussia was also extended to conquered Polish lands like Gdańsk Pomerania, although it was not inhabited by Baltic Prussians but Lechitic Poles. Meanwhile, the Ostsiedlung started to turn Slavic narrow Pomerania into an increasingly German-settled area; the remaining Wends and Polish people, often known as Kashubians, continued to settle within Pomerelia. In 1325 the line of the princes of Rügen died out, and the principality was inherited by the Griffins.

Renaissance (circa 1400–1700) to Early Modern Age

In 1466, with the Teutonic Order's defeat in the Thirteen Years' War, Pomerelia became again subject to the Polish Crown and formed the Pomeranian Voivodeship within the province of Royal Prussia. While the German population in the Duchy of Pomerania adopted the Protestant reformation in 1534, the Polish (along with Kashubian) population remained with the Roman Catholic Church. The Thirty Years' War severely ravaged and depopulated narrow Pomerania; few years later this same happened to Pomerelia (the Deluge). With the extinction of the Griffin house during the same period, the Duchy of Pomerania was divided between the Swedish Empire and Brandenburg-Prussia in 1648, while Pomerelia remained in with the Polish Crown.

Modern Age

Prussia gained the southern parts of Swedish Pomerania in 1720, invaded and annexed Pomerelia from Poland in 1772 and 1793, and gained the remainder of Swedish Pomerania in 1815, after the Napoleonic Wars. The former Brandenburg-Prussian Pomerania and the former Swedish parts were reorganized into the Prussian Province of Pomerania, while Pomerelia was made part of the Province of West Prussia. With Prussia, both provinces joined the newly constituted German Empire in 1871. Under German rule, the Polish minority suffered discrimination and oppressive measures aimed at eradicating its culture.

Following the German Empire's defeat in World War I, however, Pomorze Gdańskie/Pomerelia was returned to the rebuilt Polish state as part of the so-called Polish Corridor), while German-majority Gdansk/Danzig was transformed into the independent Free City of Danzig. In 1938 Germany's Province of Pomerania was expanded  to include northern parts of the former Province of Posen–West Prussia, and in late 1939 the annexed Pomorze Gdańskie/Polish Corridor became part of the wartime Reichsgau Danzig-West Prussia. The Nazis deported the Pomeranian Jews to a reservation near Lublin in Pomerelia. The Polish population suffered heavily during the Nazi oppression; more than 40,000 died in executions, death camps, prisons and forced labour, primarily those who were teachers, businessmen, priests, politicians, former army officers, and civil servants. Thousands of Poles and Kashubians suffered deportation, their homes taken over by the German military and civil servants, as well as some Baltic Germans resettled there between 1940 and 1943.

After Nazi Germany's defeat in World War II, the German–Polish border was shifted west to the Oder–Neisse line, and all of Pomerania was in the Soviet Occupation Zone. The German inhabitants of the former eastern territories of Germany and Poles of German ethnicity from Pomerelia were expelled.  Between 1945 and 1948, millions of ethnic Germans (Volksdeutsche) and German citizens (Reichsdeutsche), were removed from former German territory now governed by Poland and other Eastern European countries. Many German civilians were sent to internment and labor camps where they were used as forced labor as part of German reparations to countries in Eastern Europe.  The death toll attributable to the flight and expulsions is disputed, with low-range estimates in the hundreds of thousands (see: Flight and Expulsion of Germans 1944-1950).  
The area was resettled primarily with Poles of Polish ethnicity, (some themselves expellees from former eastern Poland) and some Poles of Ukrainian ethnicity (resettled under Operation Vistula) and few Polish Jews. Most of Hither or Western Pomerania (Vorpommern) remained in Germany, and most of the expelled Pomeranians found refuge there, later many moved on to other German regions and abroad. Today German Hither Pomerania forms the eastern part of the state of Mecklenburg-Vorpommern, while the Polish part is divided mainly between the West Pomeranian, Pomeranian voivodeships, with their capitals in Szczecin and Gdańsk. During the 1980s, the Solidarity and Die Wende ("the change") movements overthrew the Communist regimes implemented during the post-war era; since then, Pomerania is democratically governed.

Pomeranian dialect and traditions still live in the country of Brazil in a colony where the language is still spoken. The arrival of Pomerania immigrants with Germans and Italians helped form the state of Espírito Santo since the early 1930s. Their importance and respect are one of the cultural signatures of the area. The Brazilian city of Pomerode (in the state of Santa Catarina) was founded by Pomeranian Germans in 1861 and is considered the most typically German of all the German towns of southern Brazil.

Demographics

The German part of Western Pomerania is inhabited by German Pomeranians. In other parts, Poles are the dominant ethnic group since the territorial changes of Poland after World War II, and the resulting Polonization. Kashubians, descendants of the medieval West Slavic Pomeranians, are numerous in rural Pomerelia.

German Hither Pomerania had a population of about 470,000 in 2012 (districts of Vorpommern-Rügen and Vorpommern-Greifswald combined) – while the Polish districts of Hither Pomerania had a population of about 580,000 in 2012 (Szczecin and Świnoujście cities with powiat rights, Police County, as well as Goleniów Wolin and Międzyzdroje gminas combined). So overall, about 1.15 million people live in the historical region of Hither Pomerania today, while the Szczecin metropolitan area reaches even further.

Pomerelia is dominated by the Tricity metropolitan area (Pomeranian Voivodeship) with its population in 2012 estimated at least at 1,035,000 and the area at 1,332,51 km2, encompassing the Tricity itself with a population of 748,986 combining the eponymous three cities of Gdańsk (population 460,427), Gdynia (population 248,726) and Sopot (population 38,217), as well as the Little Kashubian Tricity with a population of 120,158 people (2012), formed by the City of Wejherowo (population 50,310 in 2012) and the towns (urban gminas) of Rumia (population 49,230 in 2020) and Reda (population 26,011 in 2019). The area also includes two smaller towns of Żukowo and Pruszcz Gdański belonging to the eponymous urban-rural gminas, and a number of rural gminas.

Cities in Pomerania
Altogether, there are 16 cities in the broad-sense Pomerania, understood as comprising also Pomerelia. Their list is presented below and includes the 14 municipalities in Poland electing a city mayor instead of a town mayor, with 9 of them holding the status of a city with powiat rights (an independent city), as well as the 2 municipalities in Germany holding the status of a district-belonging city, as no city of the German part of Pomerania holds currently any higher status, such as a partially of fully independent city (Kreisfreie Stadt, or Stadtkreis), or a city-state.

Cities in the historical region of Hither Pomerania
 Szczecin (city with powiat rights, West Pomeranian Voivodeship): 408,913; up to 763,321 in the metropolitan area
 Stralsund (Vorpommern-Rügen district, Mecklenburg-Vorpommern): 59,418
 Greifswald (Low German: Griepswohld; Vorpommern-Greifswald district, Mecklenburg-Vorpommern): 59,232
 Świnoujście (city with powiat rights, West Pomeranian Voivodeship); 40,864
 In addition, the Brandenburgian city of Schwedt expanded in the contemporary times, so that its neighbourhoods north of Welse are located in historical Hither Pomeraniq

Cities in the historical region of Farther Pomerania
 Koszalin (city with powiat rights, West Pomeranian Voivodeship): 109,343
 Słupsk (city with powiat rights, Pomeranian Voivodeship): 94,849
 Stargard (Stargard County, West Pomeranian Voivodeship): 69,724
 Kołobrzeg (Kołobrzeg County, West Pomeranian Voivodeship); 46,259

Cities in the historical region of Pomerelia
 Tricity (Pomeranian Voivodeship): 748,986; the Tricity metropolitan area (Pomeranian Voivodeship): population in 2012; at least 1,035,000 area 1,332,51 km2
 Gdańsk (city with powiat rights, Pomeranian Voivodeship): 460,427
 Gdynia (city with powiat rights, Pomeranian Voivodeship): 248,726
 Sopot (city with powiat rights, Pomeranian Voivodeship): 38,217
 Toruń (city with powiat rights, Kuyavian-Pomeranian Voivodeship): 205,934
 Grudziądz (city with powiat rights, Kuyavian-Pomeranian Voivodeship): 96,042
 Tczew (Tczew County, Pomeranian Voivodeship): 60,279
 Wejherowo (Wejherowo County, Pomeranian Voivodeship): 50,375
 Starogard Gdański (Starogard County, Pomeranian Voivodeship): 44,470

Culture

Languages and dialects

In the German part of Pomerania, Standard German and the East Low German Mecklenburgisch-Vorpommersch
and Central Pomeranian dialects are spoken, though Standard German dominates. Polish is the dominating language in the Polish part; Kashubian dialects are also spoken by the Kashubians in Pomerelia.

East Pomeranian, the East Low German dialect of Farther Pomerania and western Pomerelia, Low Prussian, the East Low German dialect of eastern Pomerelia, and Standard German were dominating in Pomerania east of the Oder-Neisse line before most of its speakers were expelled after World War II. Slovincian was spoken at the Farther Pomeranian–Pomerelian frontier, but is now extinct.

Kashubian and East Low German are also spoken by the descendants of émigrées, most notably in the Americas (e.g. Argentina, Brazil, Chile and Canada).

Cuisine
 For typical food and beverages of the region, see Pomeranian cuisine.

Museums

At least 50 museums in Poland cover the history of Pomerania, the most important of them being the District Museum in Toruń, the Museum in Grudziądz, the National Museum in Gdańsk, the National Maritime Museum, Gdańsk, the Museum of the Second World War in Gdańsk, the Museum of Sopot, the Emigration Museum in Gdynia, the Museum of Polish Navy in Gdynia, the Museum of Kociewie in Starogard Gdański, the Museum of Kashubian and Pomeranian Literature and Music in Wejherowo, the Kashubian Museum in Kartuzy, the Central Pomerania Museum in Słupsk, the Darłowo Museum, the Koszalin Museum, the Museum of Polish Arms in Kołobrzeg, the Museum of Archeology and History in Stargard, the National Museum in Szczecin, and the Museum of Maritime Fisheries in Świnoujście,

The Pomeranian State Museum in Greifswald, as well as the Stralsund Museum, both have a variety of archeological findings and artefacts dedicated to the history of Pomerania from the different periods covered in this article.

Education

Universities
There are four traditional (non-profiled and multi-faculty, public research) universities in the region, namely the University of Greifswald, the University of Szczecin, the University of Gdańsk and the Nicolaus Copernicus University in Toruń, the oldest of which, the University of Greifswald, was founded when Greifswald belonged to Duchy of Pomerania, thus being one of the oldest universities in the world.

Economy
Agriculture primarily consists of raising livestock, forestry, fishery, and the cultivation of cereals, sugar beets, and potatoes. Industrial food processing is increasingly relevant in the region. Key producing industries are shipyards, mechanical engineering facilities (i.e. renewable energy components), and sugar refineries, along with paper and wood fabricators. Service industries today are an important economical factor in Pomerania, most notably with logistics, information technology, life science, biotechnology, health care, and other high-tech branches often clustering around research facilities of the Pomeranian universities.

Since the late 19th century, tourism has been an important sector of the economy, primarily in the numerous seaside resorts along the coast.

Gallery

See also
 German exonyms (Pomorze)
 History of Pomerania
 Kashubian-Pomeranian Association
 Pomerania State Museum
 Pomeranian (dog)
 Pomerode
 Eastern Pomerania (disambiguation)
 Western Pomerania (disambiguation)
 Middle Pomerania
 Pomeranian (disambiguation)

Footnotes

External links

Internet directories

Culture and history
 Pomeranian dukes castle in Szczecin (Polish, German, English)
 Pomeranian (German)
 
 Collection of historical eBooks about Pomerania (German)

Maps of Pomerania
 Map of Pomerania as in 1905, in German Wikipedia
 Woiewództwa Pomorskie i Małborskie oraz Pomerania Elektorska, G.B.A.Rizzi-Zannoni 1772
 FEEFHS Map Room: German Empire – East (1882) – Pommern (Pomerania), Prussia
 Pomerania in 1789

 
Divided regions
Historical regions
Historical regions in Germany
Historical regions in Poland
Holocaust locations in Poland